The Iringa akalat (Sheppardia lowei) is a species of bird in the family Muscicapidae.
It is endemic to Iringa Region of Tanzania.

Its natural habitat is subtropical or tropical moist montane forests.
It is threatened by habitat loss.

References

Iringa akalat
Endemic birds of Tanzania
Iringa akalat
Taxonomy articles created by Polbot